The following is a list of events relating to television in Ireland from 2022.

The Late Late Toy Show broadcast on 25 November was the most watched programme on Irish television in 2022 with 1.6m viewers.

Events
19 September – RTÉ provides live coverage of the state funeral of Queen Elizabeth II from London, both on television and online.
11 December – TG4 airs the 2022 Junior Eurovision Song Contest, where Ireland's Sophie Lennon finished in fourth place with her entry "Solas", achieving Ireland's best result to date in the contest.

Debuts
18 May – Conversations with Friends on RTÉ One
1 July - The Main Stage on  RTÉ One
28 August - North Sea Connection on  RTÉ One

Ongoing television programmes

1960s
 RTÉ News: Nine O'Clock (1961–present)
 RTÉ News: Six One (1962–present)
 The Late Late Show (1962–present)

1970s
 The Late Late Toy Show (1975–present)
 The Sunday Game (1979–present)

1980s
 Fair City (1989–present)
 RTÉ News: One O'Clock (1989–present)

1990s
 Would You Believe (1990s–present)
 Winning Streak (1990–present)
 Prime Time (1992–present)
 Nuacht RTÉ (1995–present)
 Nuacht TG4 (1996–present)
 Reeling In the Years (1999–present)
 Ros na Rún (1996–present)
 TV3 News (1998–present)
 Ireland AM (1999–present)
 Telly Bingo (1999–present)

2000s
 Nationwide (2000–present)
 TV3 News at 5.30 (2001–present) – now known as the 5.30
 Against the Head (2003–present)
 news2day (2003–present)
 Other Voices (2003–present)
 The Week in Politics (2006–present)
 At Your Service (2008–present)
 Operation Transformation (2008–present)
 3e News (2009–present)
 Two Tube (2009–present)

2010s
 Jack Taylor (2010–present)
 Mrs. Brown's Boys (2011–present)
 MasterChef Ireland (2011–present)
 Today (2012–present)
 The Works (2012–present)
 Second Captains Live (2013–present)
 Ireland's Fittest Family (2014–present)
 Claire Byrne Live (2015–2022)
 The Restaurant (2015–present)
 Red Rock (2015–present)
 TV3 News at 8 (2015–present)
 First Dates (2016–present)
 Dancing with the Stars (2017–2020, 2022–present)
 The Tommy Tiernan Show (2017–present)
 Striking Out (2017–present)

2020s
 DIY SOS: The Big Build Ireland (2020-present)
 The Style Counsellors (2020–present)
 Smother (2021–present)

Ending this year
 30 May – Claire Byrne Live'' (2015–2022)

References

2022 in Irish television